Brad Maloney (born 19 January 1972) is an Australian soccer coach, currently managing the Australia national under-17 soccer team.

As a player, he was an Australian Institute of Sport scholarship holder, and in his senior career played for several National Soccer League clubs, including Marconi Fairfield, Perth Glory and Newcastle Breakers.

References

External links
 Aussie Footballers Mailer to Marangoni

1972 births
Living people
Soccer players from Sydney
Association football midfielders
Australia international soccer players
Olympic soccer players of Australia
National Soccer League (Australia) players
APIA Leichhardt FC players
Marconi Stallions FC players
Perth Glory FC players
Sydney Olympic FC players
Guangzhou F.C. players
Expatriate footballers in China
Australian expatriate sportspeople in China
Australian Institute of Sport soccer players
Australian soccer players
Newcastle Breakers FC players
Footballers at the 1992 Summer Olympics
1998 OFC Nations Cup players
Australian expatriate soccer coaches